Nandi Awards for the year 2014 announced by Andhra Pradesh Government on 14 November 2017 The Nandamuri Balakrishna starrer Legend emerged as a big winner by winning eight awards for the year.  The NTR National award for the year was conferred upon actor Kamal Haasan.

Winners list

Controversies

There is a huge uproar about Nandi Awards jury committee. Many film producers, directors, film critics and public had a contradicting view on the awards final list.
Film critic Kaathi Mahesh said the awards selection committee has a conflict of interest in awarding the final list, He named film actor Balakrishna in it.

See also
Nandi Awards of 2013

References

2014
2014 Indian film awards
Lists of Indian award winners